Perth Busport is an underground bus station, located underneath Wellington Street, Perth, Western Australia. It was officially opened by then Premier of Western Australia Colin Barnett and then Minister for Transport Dean Nalder on 13 July 2016.

Description 

Perth Busport is located underground, west of Perth railway station, between Wellington, Roe Street and Milligan streets. There are two bus access points, from Wellington Street and Milligan Street, and three passenger entrances, at Yagan Square, Queen Street, and King Street. The underground lounge is air-conditioned, contains 160 seats, two kiosks, and digital screens displaying updated departure information. Buses loop around the lounge, which is surrounded by double-glazed glass, and has sixteen stands grouped into four areas, each with four stands.

History
Perth Busport commenced operations on 17 July 2016, served by 25 Transperth routes operated by Path Transit, Swan Transit and Transdev WA. The temporary Roe Street bus station closed on the same day as the new busport opened.

Bus routes
34 regular Transperth bus services start and terminate at Perth Busport. The busport uses a dynamic stand allocation system, meaning that services are only allocated a specific stand as they approach the busport. Rail replacement bus services for the Joondalup, Mandurah, Fremantle, Midland and Armadale railway lines also start and terminate at Perth Busport when the lines cannot operate from Perth Station, departing from stands 5-8.

References

External links

Bus stations in Perth, Western Australia
Wellington Street, Perth
Perth City Link